Charles Harrington Elster (born 1957, New York City) is an American writer, broadcaster, and logophile.  In 1998, he cofounded and cohosted the weekly public radio show A Way with Words, which he resigned from in 2004 after a dispute with management.

Elster is the author of numerous books about language, including the adult vocabulary-building programs Word Workout and Verbal Advantage; the high school vocabulary-building novels Tooth and Nail: A Novel Approach to the SAT and Test of Time: A Novel Approach to the SAT and ACT; The Big Book of Beastly Mispronunciations, which the late William Safire of The New York Times called "the most readable, sensible, and prescriptive guide to the words that trip us up"; The Accidents of Style: Good Advice on How Not to Write Badly; There's a Word for It, a lighthearted guide to unusual but unusually useful words; What in the Word? Wordplay, Word Lore, and Answers to Your Peskiest Questions About Language; and How to Tell Fate from Destiny, and Other Skillful Word Distinctions.

Elster was a consultant for Garner's Modern English Usage and he is the pronunciation editor of Black's Law Dictionary. His articles have appeared in the Boston Globe, Wall Street Journal, Los Angeles Times, San Diego Union-Tribune, Copyediting, Verbatim, and other publications. He is also a voice talent with more than 25 years' experience recording educational material, industrials, and books—including his own Verbal Advantage, Word Workout, and How to Tell Fate from Destiny.

References

External links
 CNN
 The San Diego Union-Tribune
 The San Diego Union-Tribune
 The Southeast Missourian
 San Diego Uptown News
 KOA News Radio
 Hartford Courant

Living people
American male writers
American broadcasters
1957 births